Thema macroscia is a moth of the family Oecophoridae. It is found in Australia.

The larvae feed on leaf litter.

References

Oecophoridae